Northern Sorsogon (also Masbate Sorsogon, Northern Sorsoganon, Sorsogon Bicolano) is a Bisayan language spoken in the central part of Sorsogon, Philippines, in Sorsogon City and the municipalities of Casiguran, and Juban. It is closely related to, but distinct from Southern Sorsogon which is spoken in the southern part of Sorsogon.

It is one of the three Bisayan languages spoken in the Bicol region, next to Southern Sorsogon and Masbateño.

References 

Languages of Sorsogon
Visayan languages